Wendy Naiely Carballo Rosa (born 28 July 2002) is a Uruguayan professional footballer who plays as a forward for Brazilian Série A1 side Sport Club Internacional and the Uruguay women's national team.

Club career
Carballo has played for Arachanas Cerro Largo in Uruguay.

International career
Carballo represented Uruguay at the 2018 South American U-17 Women's Championship. She made her senior debut on 6 October 2019 in a 0–3 friendly loss to Chile.

International goals
Scores and results list Uruguay's goal tally first

References 

2002 births
Living people
Uruguayan women's footballers
Women's association football forwards
Sport Club Internacional players
Campeonato Brasileiro de Futebol Feminino Série A1 players
Uruguay women's international footballers
Uruguayan expatriate women's footballers
Uruguayan expatriate sportspeople in Brazil
Expatriate women's footballers in Brazil